Thiazole, or 1,3-thiazole, is a heterocyclic compound that contains both sulfur and nitrogen. The term 'thiazole' also refers to a large family of derivatives. Thiazole itself is a pale yellow liquid with a pyridine-like odor and the molecular formula C3H3NS.  The thiazole ring is notable as a component of the vitamin thiamine (B1).

Molecular and electronic structure
Thiazoles are members of the azoles, heterocycles that include imidazoles and oxazoles. Thiazole can also be considered a functional group. Oxazoles are related compounds, with sulfur replaced by oxygen. Thiazoles are structurally similar to imidazoles, with the thiazole sulfur replaced by nitrogen.

Thiazole rings are planar and aromatic.  Thiazoles are characterized by larger pi-electron delocalization than the corresponding oxazoles and have therefore greater aromaticity. This aromaticity is evidenced by the chemical shift of the ring protons in proton NMR spectroscopy (between 7.27 and 8.77 ppm), clearly indicating a strong diamagnetic ring current.  The calculated pi-electron density marks C5 as the primary site for electrophilic substitution, and C2 as the site for nucleophilic substitution.

Occurrence of thiazoles and thiazolium salts

Thiazoles are found in a variety of specialized products, often fused with benzene derivatives, the so-called benzothiazoles.  In addition to vitamin B1, the thiazole ring is found in epothilone. Other important thiazole derivatives are benzothiazoles, for example, the firefly chemical luciferin. Whereas thiazoles are well represented in biomolecules, oxazoles are not. It is found in naturally occurring peptides, and utilised in the development of peptidomimetics (i.e. molecules that mimic the function and structure of peptides).

Commercial significant thiazoles include mainly dyes and fungicides.  Thifluzamide, Tricyclazole, and Thiabendazole are marketed for control of various agricultural pests. Another widely used thiazole derivative is the non-steroidal anti-inflammatory drug Meloxicam. The following anthroquinone dyes contain benzothiazole subunits: Algol Yellow 8 (CAS# [6451-12-3]), Algol Yellow GC (CAS# [129-09-9]), Indanthren Rubine B (CAS# [6371-49-9]), Indanthren Blue CLG (CAS# [6371-50-2], and Indanthren Blue CLB (CAS#[6492-78-0]). These thiazole dye are used for dyeing cotton.

Organic synthesis
Various laboratory methods exist for the organic synthesis of thiazoles. Prominent is the Hantzsch thiazole synthesis is a reaction between haloketones and thioamides. For example, 2,4-dimethylthiazole is synthesized from thioacetamide and chloroacetone. Another example  is given below:

 In an adaptation of the Robinson-Gabriel synthesis, a 2-acylamino-ketones reacts with phosphorus pentasulfide.
 In the Cook-Heilbron synthesis, an α-aminonitrile reacts with carbon disulfide.
 Certain thiazoles can be accessed through application of the Herz reaction.

Biosynthesis
Thiazoles are generally formed via reactions of cysteine, which provides the N-C-C-S backbone of the ring. Thiamine does not fit this pattern however. Several biosynthesis routes lead to the thiazole ring as required for the formation of thiamine.  Sulfur of the thiazole is derived from cysteine.  In anaerobic bacteria, the CN group is derived from dehydroglycine.

Reactions
With a pKa of 2.5 for the conjugate acid, thiazoles are far less basic than imidazole (pKa =7). 

Deprotonation at C2: the negative charge on this position is stabilized as an ylide; Hauser bases and organolithium compounds react at this site, replacing the proton

 2-(trimethylsiliyl)thiazole  (with a trimethylsilyl group in the 2-position) is a stable substitute and reacts with a range of electrophiles such as aldehydes, acyl halides, and ketenes

 Electrophilic aromatic substitution at C5 requires activating groups such as a methyl group in this bromination:

 Nucleophilic aromatic substitution often requires a leaving group such as chlorine at C2 with

 Organic oxidation at nitrogen gives the aromatic thiazole N-oxide; many oxidizing agents exist, such as mCPBA; a novel one is hypofluorous acid prepared from fluorine and water in acetonitrile; some of the oxidation takes place at sulfur, leading to non-aromatic sulfoxide/sulfone:

 Thiazoles are formyl synthons; conversion of R-thia to the R-CHO aldehyde takes place with, respectively, methyl iodide (N-methylation), organic reduction with sodium borohydride, and hydrolysis with Mercury(II) chloride in water.
 Thiazoles can react in cycloadditions, but in general at high temperatures due to favorable aromatic stabilization of the reactant; Diels-Alder reactions with alkynes are followed by extrusion of sulfur, and the endproduct is a pyridine; in one study, a very mild reaction of a 2-(dimethylamino)thiazole with dimethyl acetylenedicarboxylate (DMAD) to a pyridine was found to proceed through a zwitterionic intermediate in a formal [2+2]cycloaddition to a cyclobutene, then to a 1,3-thiazepine in a 4-electron electrocyclic ring opening and then to a 7-thia-2-azanorcaradiene in a 6-electron electrocyclic ring, closing before extruding the sulfur atom.

Thiazolium salts
Alkylation of thiazoles at nitrogen forms a thiazolium cation.  Thiazolium salts are catalysts in the Stetter reaction and the Benzoin condensation.  Deprotonation of N-alkyl thiazolium salts give the free carbenes and transition metal carbene complexes.

Alagebrium is a thiazolium-based drug.

References

 
Aromatic bases
Simple aromatic rings